Weisband is a surname. Notable people with the surname include:

 Bill Weisband (1908–1967), American cryptanalyst and NKVD agent
 Marina Weisband (born 1987), German politician